Chandimarh or Chandi Marh is a village in Poonch district, Jammu and Kashmir, India, situated between Noori Chamb and Bufliaz Block. It is 26 km east of the district headquarters Poonch, and 22 km from sub-district headquarter Surankote. Nearby towns and they are; Thanamandi town towards South, Surankote tehsil towards North, Balakote Block towards west, Darhal Block towards South.

Population
According to the 2011 Census of India, there are 700 households in the village, with a total population of 3870, of which 2017 are males and 1853 are females.

Transport

Air
The nearest airports to Chandimarh are Jammu Airport and Srinagar International Airport, located 205 and 125 kilometres respectively.

Rail
Chandimarh doesn't have a railway station. The nearest railway station is Anantnag railway station located at a distance of 106 kilometres and nearest major railway station is Jammu Tawi railway station located at a distance of 203 kilometres.

Road
Chandimarh is connected by road through the Mughal Road and NH 144A with other places in Jammu and Kashmir.

References

Cities and towns in Poonch district, India